Oxyepoecus bruchi is a species of ant in the subfamily Myrmicinae. It is endemic to Argentina.

References

External links

Myrmicinae
Endemic fauna of Argentina
Hymenoptera of South America
Insects described in 1926
Taxonomy articles created by Polbot